The 1943–44 Taça de Portugal was the sixth season of the Taça de Portugal (English: Portuguese Cup), the premier Portuguese football knockout competition, organized by the Portuguese Football Federation (FPF). Benfica was the defending champion and played Estoril in the final on 28 May 1944.

Participating Teams

Primeira Divisão 
(10 Teams)
Associação Académica de Coimbra – Organismo Autónomo de Futebol
Atlético Clube de Portugal 
Clube de Futebol Os Belenenses
Sport Lisboa e Benfica
Sporting Clube Olhanense
Futebol Clube do Porto
Sport Comércio e Salgueiros
Sporting Clube de Portugal
Vitória Sport Clube "de Guimarães"
Vitória Futebol Clube "de Setúbal"

Segunda Divisão 
(6 Teams)
Grupo Desportivo Estoril Praia
Futebol Clube Famalicão
Luso Sport Clube "Beja"
Clube de Futebol União de Coimbra
Clube de Futebol Os Unidos "de Lisboa"
Sport Clube Vila Real

First round

Results

|}

Quarterfinals

Results

|}

Quarterfinal play-off

Semifinals

Results

|}

Final

References

External links
Official webpage 
1943–44 Taça de Portugal at zerozero.pt 

Taça de Portugal seasons
Port
Taca